Dharam Yudh Morcha is a Punjabi film about the era from 1947 to 1984 that highlights the fight of the Sikh people of India to safeguard the fundamental rights of the Sikh religion and linguistic minorities and to establish an equal Sikh Rights in the Region of India.  The film originates from the Punjabi Suba movement to create a province for the Punjabi Sikh people and the ensuing conflicts between the proponents of the movement and the Indian Government. The movie seeks to shed light on the distortion of the peaceful Dharam Yudh Morcha protest movement into a violent protest.
The story is taken from 200-plus eyewitness accounts and official documents. Information gathering and research for the movie took almost 3 years to compile and execute into a story and screenplay.  The script was finished in July, 2015. The film derives its title from "Dharam Yudh Morcha" which was launched in the year 1982 to implement the Anandpur Sahib Resolution.

The film was directed by Naresh S Garg. The story was written by Karamjit Singh Batth. The film stars Raj Kakra, Karamjit Singh Batth as Satnam Singh, with Nitu Pandher, Shakku Rana, Amritpal Singh, Malkeet Rauni, Victor John, Sunny Gill, Sarabjit Purewal and Rajwinder Samrala in supporting roles.
The movie was filmed on location in India, primarily in a village around Anandpur Sahib, as well as around the Golden Temple Amritsar, Village Mehta, Village Rode (Moga) and around Mohali (Punjab). The film was banned in India.

Plot
The film depicts the story of Satnam Singh, who is a survivor of the Blue Star Attack.  His grandson finds a picture of young Satnam Singh and questions him about his past life. The story revolves around the era when Satnam Singh was a young man and he tells his grandson about being involved in the Punjabi Suba Movement and the Dharam Yudh Morcha, as well as the escalation from peaceful protest to the violence which ensued when the Indian Government, viewing the movement as secessionist, moved against the protestors with military force.

Historical events and topics featured in the film include The River Water Dispute, the Anandpur Sahib Resolution, the 1978 Nirankari kand, the Dharam Yudh Morcha, the arrest of over thirty thousand Sikhs in two-and-a-half months in 1982, the life of Jarnail Singh Bhindranwale, and Operation Bluestar.

Cast

 Raj Kakra as Surinder Singh Sodhi
 Nitu Pandher
 Shakku Rana as Surinder Shinda
 Amritpal Singh Billa
 Malkeet Rauni as CM of Punjab
 Karamjit Singh Batth
 Victor John
 Sunny Gill
 Sarabjit Purewal as Gurcharan Singh Tohra
 Rajwinder Samrala

Production

Development

The script was completed in July 2015 after 3 years of extensive research into the events surrounding the Dharam Yudh Morcha movement, (from which the film takes its name), and the violent clashes between the Indian Government's military forces and Sikh protestors, who were viewed as a secessionist threat. It is a true story, based on historical research and eyewitness accounts from more than 200 witnesses.

Filming

The movie was filmed from late 2015 to early 2016 in India. Initially, filming was done in a village around Anandpur Sahib, however, when Shiv Sena protested against the production, filming was completed around the golden temple Amritsar, Village mehta, Village Rode (Moga), around Mohali (Punjab).

Music
The music for the movie was created by Anu Manu, with the background score by Beat Minister.

Release
The movie was released on 16 September 2016.

References

External links
 

Films about massacres of Sikhs
Insurgency in Punjab in fiction
Punjabi-language Indian films
2010s Punjabi-language films
2016 films
Fictional portrayals of the Punjab Police (India)
Films set in Amritsar
Films set in Punjab, India